The Battle of the Alamo (February 23 – March 6, 1836) was a crucial conflict of the Texas Revolution. In 1835, colonists from the United States joined with Tejanos (Mexicans born in Texas) in putting up armed resistance to the centralization of the Mexican government. President Antonio López de Santa Anna and the government in Mexico City believed the United States had instigated the insurrection with a goal of annexing Texas.

In an effort to tamp down on the unrest, martial law was declared and military governor General Martín Perfecto de Cos established headquarters in San Antonio de Béxar, stationing his troops at the Alamo. When the Texian volunteer soldiers gained control of the fortress at the Siege of Béxar, compelling Cos to surrender on December 9, many saw his expulsion to the other side of the Rio Grande as the end of Mexican forces in Texas. Most Texian soldiers in Béxar left to join a planned invasion of Matamoros, Mexico.

Garrison commander James C. Neill went home on family matters February 11, 1836, leaving James Bowie and William B. Travis as co-commanders over the predominantly volunteer force. When the Mexican Army of Operations under the command of Santa Anna arrived in Béxar with 1,500 troops on February 23, the remaining Alamo garrison numbered 150. Over the course of the next several days, new volunteers arrived inside the fortress while others were sent out as couriers, to forage for food, or to buy supplies.

A fierce defense was launched from within the walls, even as Bowie and Travis made unsuccessful attempts to negotiate with the Mexican army. Travis repeatedly dispatched couriers with pleas for reinforcements. Although Santa Anna refused to consider a proposed conditional surrender, he extended an offer of amnesty for all Tejanos inside the fortress to walk away unharmed. Most Tejanos evacuated from the fortress about February 25, either as part of the amnesty, or as a part of Juan Seguín's company of courier scouts on their last run.

In response to pleas from Travis, James Fannin started from Goliad with 320 men, supplies and armaments, yet had to abort a day later due to a wagon breakdown. Final reinforcements were able to enter the Alamo during March 1–4, most of them from Gonzales which had become a recruitment camp. Others who had left intending to return were unable to re-enter. At 5:30 a.m. on March 6, the Mexican army began the final siege. An hour later, all combatants inside the Alamo were dead. The bodies, with the exception of Gregorio Esparza's, were cremated on pyres and abandoned. Esparza's brother Francisco was a soldier in the Mexican army and received permission from Santa Anna for a Christian burial.

Juan Seguín oversaw the 1837 recovery of the abandoned ashes and officiated at the February 25 funeral. The March 28 issue of the Telegraph and Texas Register only gave the burial location as where "the principal heap of ashes" had been found. In the following decades, the public wanted to know the location of the burial site, but Seguín gave conflicting statements, perceived as due to age-related memory problems. Remains thought to be those of the Alamo defenders were discovered at the Cathedral of San Fernando during the Texas 1936 centennial, and re-interred in a marble sarcophagus. Purported to hold the ashes of Travis, Bowie and Crockett, some have doubted it can be proven whose remains are entombed there.

Identifying the combatants
Below are 256 known combatants: 212 who died during the siege, 43 survivors, and one escapee who later died of his wounds.

Mexican Colonel Juan Almonte, Santa Anna's aide-de-camp, recorded the Texian fatality toll as 250 in his March 6 journal entry. He listed the survivors as five women, one Mexican soldier and one slave. Almonte did not record names, and his count was based solely on who was there during the final assault. Santa Anna reported to Mexico's Secretary of War Tornel that Texian fatalities exceeded 600. Historians Jack Jackson and John Wheat attributed that high figure to Santa Anna's playing to his political base.

Research into the battle, and exactly who was inside the fortress, began when the Alamo fell and has continued with no signs of abatement. The first published Texian list of casualties was in the March 24, 1836 issue of the Telegraph and Texas Register. The 115 names  were supplied by couriers John Smith and Gerald Navan, whom historian Thomas Ricks Lindley believed likely drew from their own memories, as well as from interviews with those who might have left or tried to enter. In an 1860 statement for the Texas Almanac, former San Antonio alcalde (mayor) Francisco Antonio Ruiz set the number at 182.

When the Alamo Cenotaph was created by Pompeo Coppini in 1939, the 187 defender names on the monument came from the research of Amelia Williams, considered the leading Alamo authority of her day.  Her work is still used by some as a benchmark, although skepticism has been voiced. Lindley's 2003 Alamo Traces: New Evidence and New Conclusions is the result of his 15-year study of the battle, and upended much of what was previously accepted as fact. He devoted a chapter to deconstructing Williams' research as "misrepresentation, alteration, and fabrication of data", criticizing her sole reliance on the military land grants without checking through the muster lists to identify the combatants. In lieu of service pay, the cash-poor Republic of Texas adopted the system of military land grants. Issuance was dependent upon the military muster lists and either the veterans or their heirs filing a claim, a process that required an upfront fee to complete. Lacking a completed claim, proof of service would appear only on a muster list.

In the pursuit of uncovering every infinitesimal piece of evidence about what happened during the battle, more thorough research methods continue to evolve and Tejanos have begun to add their voices. Until recent decades, accounts of Tejano participation in the Texas revolution were notably absent, but historians such as Timothy M. Matovina and  Jesús F. de la Teja have helped add that missing perspective to the battle's events.

Key to military rank abbreviations

Key to military rank abbreviations

Defenders

See also

 List of Texian survivors of the Battle of the Alamo

Citations

Notes

Footnotes

References

External links
 Jackson, Ron, "In the Alamo's Shadow" Texas A&M University reprint of an article about Joe Travis, slave of William B. Travis (originally published in True West Magazine, February 1998)

1836 in the Republic of Texas

Battles of the Texas Revolution
Davy Crockett
History of San Antonio
Sam Houston
United States history-related lists
Mexican Texas
Wars fought in Texas
Alamo defenders